Atsuko Nambu is a Japanese athlete.  She won a gold medal in the individual 100 metres and silver medals in the  relay, individual 200 metres and long jump in the 1954 Asian Games. Her deportment at the Asian Games helped to prevent disruption by Filipino spectators still seething from the brutal massacre by Japanese military forces in Manila during the last days of the occupation of the Philippines just nine years before. For her action, she was dubbed by Filipinos “sweetheart of the Games”.

References

Athletes (track and field) at the 1954 Asian Games
Japanese female sprinters
Asian Games gold medalists for Japan
Asian Games silver medalists for Japan
Asian Games medalists in athletics (track and field)
Medalists at the 1954 Asian Games